Liga ASOBAL 1999–2000 season was the tenth since its establishment. A total of 14 teams competed this season for the championship.

Competition format
This season, the competition format consisted in two phases.

Overall standing

Championship playoff
{{8TeamBracket|sets=5
| RD1=quarter-finals
| RD2=semi-finals
| RD3=final
| score-width=20
| team-width=140
| RD1-seed1=1
| RD1-team1=Barcelona
| RD1-score1-1=34
| RD1-score1-2=23
| RD1-score1-3=_
| RD1-seed2=8
| RD1-team2=Valencia Airtel
| RD1-score2-1=21
| RD1-score2-2=19
| RD1-score2-3=_
| RD1-seed3=2
| RD1-team3=<small>Caja España Ademar León</small>
| RD1-score3-1=26| RD1-score3-2=30| RD1-score3-3=_
| RD1-seed4=7
| RD1-team4=Ciudad Real
| RD1-score4-1=24
| RD1-score4-2=29
| RD1-score4-3=_
| RD1-seed5=3
| RD1-team5=Portland San Antonio</small>
| RD1-score5-1=27| RD1-score5-2=24| RD1-score5-3=_
| RD1-seed6=6
| RD1-team6=Gáldar
| RD1-score6-1=24
| RD1-score6-2=23
| RD1-score6-3=_
| RD1-seed7=4
| RD1-team7=Caja Cantabria
| RD1-score7-1=19
| RD1-score7-2=23
| RD1-score7-3=_
| RD1-seed8=4
| RD1-team8=Bidasoa| RD1-score8-1=22| RD1-score8-2=25| RD1-score8-3=_
| RD2-seed1=1
| RD2-team1=Barcelona| RD2-score1-1=28| RD2-score1-2=32| RD2-score1-3=_
| RD2-seed2=4
| RD2-team2=Bidasoa
| RD2-score2-1=22
| RD2-score2-2=22
| RD2-score2-3=_
| RD2-seed3=2
| RD2-team3=Caja España Ademar León
| RD2-score3-1=23
| RD2-score3-2=22
| RD2-score3-3=_
| RD2-seed4=3
| RD2-team4=<small>Portland San Antonio
| RD2-score4-1=27| RD2-score4-2=28| RD2-score4-3=_
| RD3-seed1=1
| RD3-team1=Barcelona| RD3-score1-1=26| RD3-score1-2=28| RD3-score1-3=25'| RD3-score1-4=_
| RD3-seed2=3
| RD3-team2=Portland San Antonio
| RD3-score2-1=22
| RD3-score2-2=24
| RD3-score2-3=23
| RD3-score2-4=_
}}

permanence playoffGranollers remained in Liga ASOBAL. Garbel Zaragoza played In–Out playoff. Redcom Airtel Chapela & CajaPontevedra relegated.In–Out playoffGarbel Zaragoza remained in Liga ASOBAL.''

Top goal scorers

1999
handball
handball
Spain